Pflugerville Independent School District (PfISD) is a public school district based in Pflugerville, Texas (USA). The District encompasses approximately ninety-five square miles and includes all or part of six municipalities including Pflugerville, Austin, Coupland, Hutto, Manor and Round Rock.

In addition to Travis County, it covers parts of Williamson County.

In 2011, the school district was rated "academically acceptable" by the Texas Education Agency. In 2014, the district installed solar panels at 11 of its schools.

Schools

High Schools (9–12)

 John B. Connally High School (Austin)
 Hendrickson High School
 Pflugerville High School
 Weiss High School
 PACE High School (Alternative campus)

Middle Schools (6–8)
 Bohls Middle School
 Cele Middle School
 Dessau Middle School (Austin)
 Kelly Lane Middle School
 Park Crest Middle School
 Pflugerville Middle School
 Westview Middle School (Austin)

Elementary Schools (Pre-K–5)
 Barron Elementary School
 Brookhollow Elementary School
 Caldwell Elementary School
 Carpenter Elementary School
 Copperfield Elementary School (Austin)
 Dearing Elementary School
 Delco Elementary School (Austin)
 Dessau Elementary School (Austin)
 Highland Park Elementary School
 Mott Elementary School
 Murchison Elementary School
 Northwest Elementary School (Austin/Wells Branch)
 Parmer Lane Elementary School (Austin)
 Pflugerville Elementary School
 River Oaks Elementary School (Austin)
 Riojas Elementary School
 Rowe Lane Elementary School
 Spring Hill Elementary School
 Timmerman Elementary School
 Wieland Elementary School
 Windermere Elementary School

Other
 Provan Opportunity Center Middle School and High School (K-12, Discipline Center)
 PACE (Alternative Campus)

See also

 List of school districts in Texas

References

External links
 Pflugerville ISD website

School districts in Travis County, Texas
School districts in Williamson County, Texas
Education in Austin, Texas